The 2011 Basildon Council election took place on 5 May 2011 to elect members of Basildon Borough Council in Essex, England. One third of the council was up for election and the Conservative party stayed in overall control of the council.

After the election, the composition of the council was
Conservative 29
Labour 11
Liberal Democrats 2

Election result
The results saw the Conservatives stay in control of the council after retaining all of the seats they had been defending. This left the Conservatives with 29 seats, compared to 11 for Labour. Meanwhile, the Liberal Democrats were reduced to 2 councillors and the party lost vote share across the council. Overall turnout in the election was 35%.

The only change in the election saw Labour gain 1 seat from the Liberal Democrats in Nethermayne, with the winning Labour candidate, Andrew Gordon, becoming the youngest councillor at the age of 18. Among the other winners was Daniel Munyambu for Labour in Vange, who became the second Kenyan to be elected as a councillor in the United Kingdom, and the former council leader Nigel Smith who returned to the council in Lee Chapel North.

All comparisons in vote share are to the corresponding 2007 election.

Ward results

Billericay East

Billericay West

Burstead

Fryerns (2 seats)

Laindon Park

Lee Chapel North

Nethermayne

Pitsea North West

Pitsea South East

St Martin's

Vange

Wickford Castledon

Wickford North

Wickford Park

References

2011
2011 English local elections
2010s in Essex